Segunda enseñanza is a Spanish television series directed and produced by Pedro Masó and written and starred by Ana Diosdado that aired in 1986 on TVE1.

Plot 
The fiction follows Pilar, a history teacher and single mother who moves to Oviedo, together with her daughter Elvira, set to work in an "innovative" high school located in the city.

Cast

Production and release 
The series, written by Ana Diosdado, was directed and produced by Pedro Masó.
Shooting primarily took place in Asturias, including Oviedo, Gijón and Luarca.

The series consisted of 13 episodes. The broadcasting run on TVE1 lasted from 23 January 1986 to 17 April 1986.

References 
Citations

Bibliography

External links 
 Segunda enseñanza on RTVE Play

La 1 (Spanish TV channel) network series
1980s Spanish drama television series
Spanish-language television shows
1986 Spanish television series debuts
Television series about educators
Television shows filmed in Spain
Spanish teen drama television series